Irish Oak may refer to

Quercus petraea, a tree also known as the 'Irish oak'
 one of two steamships operated by Irish Shipping Ltd
 MV Irish Oak, one of two motor vessels operated by Irish Shipping Ltd

See also
Irish Oaks, a horserace